Nettancourt is a commune in the Meuse department in Grand Est in north-eastern France.

Geography
The village lies on the right bank of the Chée, which flows southward through the eastern part of the commune.

 Elevation: 
 Residents : Nettancourtois (male), Nettancourtoises (female).
 Land Area : 
 Nearest commune : Noyers-Auzécourt, Sommeilles
 Nearest big city : Bar-le-Duc.

Administration

Mayors of Nettancourt :

Demography

Population structure in 2017:
 Men (51.6%) Women (48.4%)
 Population between 0 and 19: 17.5%
 Population between 20 and 64: 56.7%
 Population over 65 : 25.8%

Resources and production
 Cereals
 Livestock farming

Local and daily life 
Education : Nettancourt has its own primary school.
Shop : Bakery, hotel and restaurant, automobile repair shop, ...
Associations : Go Elan
Celebrations:  local/community holiday : second or third Sunday of July, saint day: June, the 24th. 
Like several French cities, Nettancourt has bric-a-brac sales in summer time.

Toponymy
"Nettancourt" appears in 1179. It should be a name of a man + curtius (lat.).
The name should be a male German one.
"Nettancourt" is also an aristocratic family name (see Famous people from Nettancourt).

History
Antiquity :
Nettancourt is close to a famous Roman road (it joins up Reims to Toul cities). Archaeological Gallo-Roman remains (like pieces of pottery and ancient currencies) were found in the area.
Middle Ages :
Nettancourt is an old fief belonging to Champagne.
 17th century - 18th century :
A Protestant community lived in the village between 1561 and 1685, protected by the lords of Nettancourt, converted to Calvinism.
 20th century :
Nettancourt suffers a lot from the First World War (1914–18). One day, to escape to a German offensive, the residents had to leave their village. During this time, German soldiers sat for a moment in several houses.

There are ten names in the war memorial, mobilized at the beginning of the war. They fought bravely to liberate their home.

Tourist places and monuments
Secular architecture :
	Castle of Nettancourt, built again in the 19th century.
	Castle of la Grange-aux-Champs (17th/ 18th, modified in the 19th century).
	Grande-rue : low-relief depicting Saint Hubert's legend (in the lintel of the door).
	Farm, 5-7 rue de l'Orme (group of fronts and roofs).
Sacred architecture :
	Saint-Remi Church: 15th century, restored at the 16th century and in 1708 : naves, apses, gate (1650), vault (1856).
	Saint-Jean-Baptiste chapel : ancient Protestant church, built in 1561, it became catholic after the revocation of the Edict of Nantes. It was built again in 1884.

Place of interest :
	Shore of the Chée
	Area of the church
	Pond of the mill in Sommeilles
	Hood

Notable people
 François Joseph Henri de Nettancourt-Vaubécourt d’Haussonville, bishop of Montauban
 Louis-Claude de Nettancourt-Haussonville

See also 
Communes of the Meuse department (en)
 Roman roads (en)
 Voie romaine Reims-Metz (French)

References

External links 

 Nettancourt, annuaire-mairie.fr (French)
 Personal page about Nettancourt(French)

Communes of Meuse (department)